5,6-Methylenedioxy-N-methyl-2-aminoindane (MDMAI), is a drug developed in the 1990s by a team led by David E. Nichols at Purdue University. It acts as a non-neurotoxic and highly selective serotonin releasing agent (SSRA) in animals and a putative entactogen in humans.

Chemistry 
MDMAI can be thought of as a cyclised analogue of MDMA where the alpha-methyl carbon of the alkylamino side chain has been joined back round to the 6-position of the aromatic ring to form an indane ring system. This changes the core structure of the molecule from phenethylamine to aminoindane, and causes the pharmacological properties of the two compounds to be substantially different.

References 

Entactogens and empathogens
Designer drugs
Benzodioxoles
Serotonin releasing agents